Lígia Maria Camargo Silva Cortez (São Paulo, Brazil, August 31, 1960) is a Brazilian actor, theatre director, art educator and researcher. Lígia Cortez is the daughter of the actors Célia Helena and Raul Cortez and sister of the theatre and dance director Elisa Ohtake.

As an actress she has worked across theatre, cinema and television with national and internationally directors such as Robert Wilson (director), Ron Daniels (theatre), José Celso Martinez Corrêa, Antunes Filho, David Leddy, Fauzi Arap, Roberto Lage, Hamilton Vaz Pereira, Flávio Rangel e Sérgio Bianchi. From 1981 to 1984 she was a member of the theatre company Macunaíma, directed by Antunes Filho.

Lígia Cortez has organized educational projects in the arts for marginalized communities in the State of São Paulo. She worked on the implementation of the theatre arm of Associação Arte Despertar  (Art Awakening Association) and other social projects such as: SOS Aldeia, Favela Paraisópolis and IOP; Fundação Gol de Letra; Projeto Virando o Jogo.

She is director of  Célia Helena Centro de Artes e Educação (Célia Helena Arts and Education Centre) and founder director of Casa do Teatro.

References

External links

Brazilian theatre directors
Brazilian actresses
1960 births
Living people
Actresses from São Paulo
Brazilian people of Spanish descent
Brazilian people of Portuguese descent